The Will to Love is the second studio album by American country music artist Skip Ewing. It was released on September 19, 1990, via MCA Records. The album includes the singles "It's You Again" and "If a Man Could Live on Love Alone".

Track listing

Personnel
Adapted from liner notes.

Garry Anderson - background vocals
Max T. Barnes - background vocals
John Catchings - cello
Jerry Douglas - dobro
Skip Ewing - lead vocals, background vocals, classical electric guitar on "The Will to Love", acoustic guitar on "It Wasn't His Child", Third Hand on mandolin
Mike Geiger - background vocals
Hoot Hester - mandolin
Michael Fisher - percussion
Mike Lawler - synthesizer
Claire Lynch - background vocals
Rick Marotta - drums
Woody Mullis - background vocals
Steve Nathan - synthesizer
Matt Rollings - piano
Leland Sklar - bass guitar
Billy Joe Walker Jr. - acoustic guitar
Curtis "Mr. Harmony" Young - background vocals
Liana Young - background vocals
Reggie Young - electric guitar

Chart performance

References

1989 albums
Skip Ewing albums
Albums produced by Jimmy Bowen
MCA Records albums